Sinsali (Singsali, Singsili,  Phunoi) is a Southern Loloish language of northern Laos.

References

Lama, Ziwo Qiu-Fuyuan (2012), Subgrouping of Nisoic (Yi) Languages, thesis, University of Texas at Arlington (archived)
Wright, Pamela Sue. n.d. Singsali (Phunoi) Speech Varieties Of Phongsali Province. m.s.

Southern Loloish languages
Languages of Laos